Dillwynia prostrata, commonly known as matted parrot-pea, is a species of flowering plant in the family Fabaceae and is endemic to south-eastern continental Australia. It is a prostrate shrub with hairy stems, linear to narrow oblong or spatula-shaped leaves and yellow and dark red flowers.

Description
Dillwynia prostrata is a prostrate shrub that forms roots along the stems and has hairy stems. The wings are oblong to egg-shaped, shorter than the standard, and the keel is the shortest and dark red.

Taxonomy and naming
Dillwynia prostrata was first formally described in 1939 by William Blakely in The Australian Naturalist.

Distribution
This goodenia grows in heath and woodland on the Southern Tablelands south from Braidwood in New South Wales and in East Gippsland in the far north east of Victoria.

References

oreodoxa
Flora of Victoria (Australia)
Taxa named by William Blakely
Plants described in 1939